KBUL-FM (98.1 MHz) is a commercial FM radio station licensed to Carson City, Nevada, and serving the Reno metropolitan area.  KBUL-FM airs a country music radio format, known as "K-BULL," and is owned by Cumulus Media.  Its studios and offices are located on Plumb Lane in South Reno.

The transmitter is located on McClellan Peak off Sunil Pandit Road, amid the towers for other Reno-area FM and TV stations.  KBUL-FM has an effective radiated power (ERP) of 72,000 watts.  Its signal covers West Central Nevada and the Lake Tahoe area of California.

History
The station got its construction permit from the Federal Communications Commission (FCC) on November 30, 1984, using the call sign KNSS. The company receiving the permit was Carson City Broadcasters.

The station signed on as KBUL a couple of years later.  The new call letters were chosen to identify it as "K-BULL," playing country music.  The owner was Marathon Broadcasting, with Dave Graupner serving as general manager.

In 1992, the station was acquired by Citadel Broadcasting, the forerunner to today's owner, Cumulus Media.  On October 16, 2015 the K-Bull name was changed to Nash FM to match other Cumulus-owned country stations around the U.S. using the Nash branding and platform.  It returned to using the K-Bull logo and name a few years later.

References

External links
KBUL official website

BUL-FM
BUL-FM
Country radio stations in the United States
Cumulus Media radio stations
Radio stations established in 1985
1985 establishments in Nevada